Ladji Ladji (Ledji-Ledji) is a moribund Australian Aboriginal language once widely spoken in New South Wales and Victoria by the Latjilatji (or Ladji Ladji) people.

Ladji Ladji is part of the Kulin branch of the Pama–Nyungan family of languages, which were spoken by the majority of Australian Aborigines before Australia's colonisation by the British Empire.

The Ladji Ladji lived on the Murray River in the Mildura area. White settlement of that area occurred in 1845-7.

References

Kulin languages
Extinct languages of Victoria (Australia)
Extinct languages of New South Wales